Godar Chiti (also Romanized as Godār Chītīand Godār Cheytī) is a village in Asiab Rural District, in the Central District of Omidiyeh County, Khuzestan Province, Iran. At the 2006 census, its population was 459, in 87 families.

References 

Populated places in Omidiyeh County